Star Saga: Two - The Clathran Menace is a 1989 video game published by Masterplay Publishing.

Gameplay
In this title, a gigantic armada of alien ships scours the galaxy, seeking to eliminate any and all sentient life.  Players must quickly explore the accessible reaches of space, hoping to uncover technology with which to oppose this threat.

Reception
The second game is described as being more difficult than the first, due to frequent conflicts with the Clathran "Survey Line" which inexorably moves across the galaxy.  It's also more linear, in that players are prevented from undertaking certain activities due to current game conditions.  Nonetheless, the Computer Gaming World review concludes, "Despite the few faults, Star Saga Two is a wonderfully written and produced game that can really glue you to the computer." The editors of Game Player's PC Strategy Guide gave Star Saga Two their 1989 "Best PC Science Fiction Game" award. They wrote, "Although darker and more sinister in tone than its predecessor, Star Saga: Two is still a rollicking, all-stops-out space opera".

Reviews
The Games Machine - May, 1990

References

External links
 
Review of Star Saga: Two - The Clathran Menace in Compute!

1989 video games
Adventure games
Alien invasions in video games
Apple II games
Apple IIGS games
DOS games
Role-playing video games
Science fiction video games
Video game sequels
Video games developed in the United States
Video games set in outer space
Video games set in the future